Thiafentanil (A-3080, Thianil) is a highly potent opioid analgesic that is an analog of fentanyl, and was invented in 1986. Its analgesic potency is slightly less than that of carfentanil (itself approximately 10,000 times the potency of morphine, or 4,000 times that of heroin), though with a faster onset of effects, shorter duration of action and a slightly lesser tendency to produce respiratory depression. It is used in veterinary medicine to anesthetise animals such as impala, usually in combination with other anesthetics such as ketamine, xylazine or medetomidine to reduce the prevalence of side effects such as muscle rigidity.

Side effects 
Side effects of fentanyl analogs are similar to those of fentanyl itself, which include itching, nausea and potentially serious respiratory depression, which can be life-threatening. Potent pure opioid antagonists such as naltrexone or nalmefene are recommended in the event of accidental human exposure to thiafentanil. Fentanyl analogs have killed hundreds of people throughout Europe and the former Soviet republics since the most recent resurgence in use began in Estonia in the early 2000s, and novel derivatives continue to appear. A new wave of fentanyl analogues and associated deaths began in around 2014 in the US, and have continued to grow in prevalence; especially since 2016 these drugs have been responsible for hundreds of overdose deaths every week.

Legal status 
Thiafentanil is a Schedule II controlled drug in the USA since August 2016.

See also 
 Sufentanil
 List of fentanyl analogues

References 

Anilides
Mu-opioid receptor agonists
Piperidines
Synthetic opioids
Thiophenes